Taşköprü (from the Turkish, for "Stone bridge") may refer to:

Places
Taşköprü, Düzce
Taşköprü, Kastamonu, a district in Kastamonu Province, Turkey
Taşköprü, Kulp
Taşköprü, Mustafakemalpaşa
Taşköprü, Sultandağı, a village in Afyonkarahisar Province, Turkey
Taşköprü, Yalova, a village in Yalova Province, Turkey

Buildings
Tashkopryu Mosque, a historic mosque in Plovdiv, Bulgaria
Taşköprü (Adana), an Ancient Roman bridge in Adana, Turkey
Taşköprü (Beyşehir), a historic regulator dam and bridge in Byşehir district of Konya Province, Turkey
Taşköprü (Silifke), a bridge in Silifke district of Mersin Province, Turkey